Gabriele Klein (born 1957) is a sociologist, dance theorist and professor at the University of Hamburg.

Life

From 1977 to 1987 Gabriele Klein studied Sociology, History, Sports Sciences, Contemporary Dance and Education at the Universities of Bielefeld, Bochum and Essen, as well as at the Amsterdam School of the Arts (Amsterdamse Hogeschool voor de Kunsten). She completed her Doctorate in Social Sciences at the University of Bochum in 1990. Her dissertation was published in 1992 under the title: Women Bodies Dance. A Civilization Theory of Dance (Frauen Körper Tanz. Eine Zivilisationsgeschichte des Tanzes). She was habilitated in 1998 with the study, published in 1999: Electronic Vibration. Pop Culture Theory (Electronic Vibration. Pop Kultur Theorie). In 2002 she was appointed professor at the University of Hamburg. She is also the head, since 2005, of the interdisciplinary Center for Performance Studies and the post-graduate course of the same name. She has occupied numerous international professorships.

Since 1994 she has been the head of various research projects and has appeared as organizer of numerous national and international academic events. From 1997 to 2001 she was chair of the Society for Dance Research (Gesellschaft für Tanzforschung, GTF).

Research 
Gabriele Klein’s research is concentrated on body, human movement and dance studies, as well as on pop culture, performance studies, gender studies and urban studies. The social-anthropological and gender-theoretical perspectives that she has developed, and for which she has received international awards (Curriculum Vitae), were expanded in subsequent research, in particular in studies of popular dance forms in the youth scene and in popular culture, especially techno and hip-hop culture, Latin American dances and cultural performances, which she examined primarily in everyday life, sport and the arts.

Her focus in recent research has lain in the globalization and transnationalization of dance cultures and the appropriation of dance and movement patterns and their contexts of meaning in different local and urban cultures. Gabriele Klein considers dance figurations to be a special manner of social interaction. In these social choreographies the social becomes apparent. Dance studies thus become on the one hand a research field for the sociology of the body and social choreography on the other an important aspect of social figurations. Gabriele Klein has influenced considerably the contours of this social-scientific discipline with her research and is member of the board of directors of the Society of Dance History Scholars (Dance Studies Association).

Publications

Author 
 Pina Bausch's Dance Theater. Company, Artistic Practices and Reception, Transcript: Bielefeld 2020 .
 Pina Bausch und das Tanztheater. Die Kunst des Übersetzens (Pina Bausch and Dance Theater. The Art of Translating), Transcript: Bielefeld 2019 .
 Choreografischer Baukasten (Choreographic Toolkit), edited by Gabriele Klein, Transcript: Bielefeld 2011 (with Gitta Barthel and Esther Wagner).  
 Electronic Vibration. Pop Kultur Theorie (Electronic Vibration. Pop Culture Theory), VS: Wiesbaden 2004 (Hardcover: Rogner & Bernhard: Hamburg 1999).  
 Is this real? Die Kultur des HipHop (Is this real? The Culture of HipHop), Suhrkamp: Frankfurt a. M. 2003 (with Malte Friedrich) (4. edition 2011). 
 FrauenKörperTanz. Eine Zivilisationsgeschichte des Tanzes (WomenBodiesDance. A Civilisation History of Dance), Heyne: München 1994 (Hardcover: Quadriga: Weinheim/Berlin 1992) .

Editor 
 Übersetzen und Rahmen. Praktiken medialer Transformationen (Translating and Framing. Practices of Medial Transformations), Wilhelm Fink: München 2017 (with Claudia Benthien).   
 Performance und Praxis. Praxeologische Erkundungen in Tanz, Theater, Sport und Alltag (Performance and Practice. Praxeological Investigations in Dance, Theatre, Sport and Everyday Life), Transcript: Bielefeld 2017 (with Hanna Katharina Göbel).  
 Handbuch Körpersoziologie (Handbook Sociology of the Body), 2 Vols., VS: Wiesbaden 2016 (with Robert Gugutzer and Michael Meuser). 
 Choreografischer Baukasten. Das Buch (Choreographic Toolkit. The Book), Transcript: Bielefeld 2015  
 Methoden der Tanzwissenschaft. Modellanalysen zu Pina Bauschs Le Sacre du Printemps (Methods of Dance Research. Model Analysis of Pina Bausch’s Le Sacre du Printemps), 2nd revised and enlarged edition, Transcript: Bielefeld 2015 (with Gabriele Brandstetter). 
 Dance [and] Theory, Transcript: Bielefeld 2013 (with Gabriele Brandstetter).  
 Emerging Bodies. The Performance of Worldmaking in Dance and Choreography, Transcript: Bielefeld 2011 (with Sandra Noeth). 
 Tango in Translation. Tanz zwischen Medien, Kulturen, Kunst und Politik (Tango in Translation. Dance between Media, Culture, Art and Politics), Transcript: Bielefeld 2009. 
 Bewegungsraum und Stadtkultur (Movement Space and Urban Culture), Transcript: Bielefeld 2008 (with Jürgen Funke-Wieneke). 
 Ernste Spiele. Zur politischen Soziologie des Fußballs (Serious Games. On the Political Sociology of Soccer), Transcript: Bielefeld 2008 (with Michael Meuser). 
 Ost-Europa (East Europe), tanzheft eins, ed. by Performance Studies/Tanzplan Bremen, Hamburg 2008.
 Körper (Bodies), Special Issue of the Journal Schüler, Friedrich: Velber 2002.

References 
Performance Studies, Universität Hamburg 
Gabriele Klein, Universität Hamburg 
Dance Studies Association

External links 
 Performance Studies Hamburg

1957 births
Living people
Dance research
German sociologists
German women sociologists
Academic staff of the University of Hamburg